The 2010–11 NCAA Division I men's ice hockey season began on October 2, 2010 and  concluded with the 2011 NCAA Division I men's ice hockey tournament's championship game on April 9, 2011 at the Xcel Energy Center in Saint Paul, Minnesota. This was the 64th season in which an NCAA ice hockey championship was held and is the 117th year overall where an NCAA school fielded a team.

Pre-season polls

The top 20 from USCHO.com/CBS College Sports, October 4, 2010, and the top 15 from USA Today/USA Hockey Magazine, September 27, 2010.

Regular season

Standings

2011 NCAA tournament

Note: * denotes overtime period(s)

Player stats

Scoring leaders
The following players led the league in points at the conclusion of the regular season.

  
GP = Games played; G = Goals; A = Assists; Pts = Points; PIM = Penalty minutes

Leading goaltenders
The following goaltenders led the league in goals against average at the conclusion of the regular season while playing at least 33% of their team's total minutes.

GP = Games played; Min = Minutes played; W = Wins; L = Losses; OT = Overtime/shootout losses; GA = Goals against; SO = Shutouts; SV% = Save percentage; GAA = Goals against average

Awards

NCAA

Atlantic Hockey

CCHA

ECAC

Hockey East

WCHA

See also
 2010–11 NCAA Division II men's ice hockey season
 2010–11 NCAA Division III men's ice hockey season
 2010–11 NCAA Division I women's ice hockey season

References

External links
USCHO.com 

 
NCAA